Stéphane Just (1921–1997) was a French Trotskyist.

References 

1921 births
1997 deaths
French Trotskyists